Lamprologini is a tribe of African cichlid fishes. It contains seven genera and nearly 100 species.  Over half of the species in this tribe are in the large genus Neolamprologus. Most genera in the tribe are endemic to Lake Tanganyika, but one species of Neolamprologus (N. devosi) is from the Malagarasi River in Tanzania, and several species of Lamprologus are from the Congo River Basin.

The species in this tribe are very small to medium-sized cichlids, but vary extensively in appearance and habitat preference. Unlike most Tanganyika cichlids which are mouthbrooders, Lamprologini species are substrate spawners (typically using caves or rock crevices), and some are shell dwellers.

Genera 
 Altolamprologus (3 species)
 Chalinochromis (3 species)
 Julidochromis (6 species)
 Lamprologus (19 species)
 Lepidiolamprologus (6-11 species)
 Neolamprologus (~50 species)
 Telmatochromis (7 species)
 Variabilichromis (1 species)

References

External links 
 https://web.archive.org/web/20081012094310/http://research.amnh.org/ichthyology/staff/bob/lamps/lamps.html
 
 http://www.helsinki.fi/~mhaaramo/metazoa/deuterostoma/chordata/actinopterygii/perciformes/labroidei/cichlidae/lamprologini.html
 http://www.cichlidae.com/forum/viewtopic.php?f=17&t=3254

 
Fish tribes
Pseudocrenilabrinae